The Dollmaker is a 1984 American made-for-television drama film starring Jane Fonda and based on the 1954 novel of the same title written by Harriette Arnow. It was originally broadcast on ABC on May 13, 1984.

Fonda was awarded the Primetime Emmy Award for Outstanding Lead Actress in a Limited Series or Special for her performance. Director Daniel Petrie won the Directors Guild of America Award for Outstanding Directorial Achievement in Dramatic Specials.

Plot summary
The film is the story of a family that moves from their rural home in Appalachia to Detroit, Michigan, where the father intends to find work in a factory. Gertie is hesitant to leave their home; her husband Clovis believes that it will bring the family a regular income and better way of life. What Gertie finds is a new place to exist, rather than live, and the family settles down in a tar paper shack by the railroad tracks in an industrial neighborhood.

All the while Gertie holds onto her homespun ways, one of which is carving. Clovis begins to dismiss her talents and puts down Gertie for holding onto her folk art in a modern world. Still, her handiwork is admired by those around her. One of the items that she hangs onto is a piece of a tree limb in which she sees a figure of Jesus calling to her to carve from it.

One setback after another begins to pull the family apart. Clovis doesn't find work and begins to get involved with matters that trouble Gertie; her children begin to also get involved in unsavory affairs.

The event that breaks Gertie's passivity to her situation is the death of her youngest daughter, who is killed by a railroad car. She confronts her husband, whose best intentions have led the family to this tragedy. Gertie decides that she will earn enough money to get the family back home to where it belongs. To do this she will make dolls, but she has no material from which she can carve the dolls. It is then that she takes the treasured piece of lumber that she longed to carve the Christ figure from, and splits it with an axe. From one piece of wood, she will carve many dolls. It is the only way to save the family.

From this sacrifice, the family is able to return home.

Cast
Jane Fonda – Gertie Nevels
Levon Helm – Clovis Nevels
Amanda Plummer – Mamie Childers
Susan Kingsley – Sophronie Meanwell
Ann Hearn – Max
Bob Swan – Victor
Geraldine Page – Mrs. Kendrick
Jason Yearwood – Reuben
David Brady Wilson – Enoch
Starla Whaley – Clytie
David Dawson – Amos
Nikki Creswell – Cassie
Raymond Serra – Joe
Dan Hedaya – Skyros
Ellen Marchman – Wheateye
Sheb Wooley – Mr. Kendrick

External links

1984 television films
1984 films
1984 drama films
ABC network original films
Appalachian culture in Michigan
Films based on American novels
Films directed by Daniel Petrie
Films set in Appalachia
Films set in Detroit
Films with screenplays by Hume Cronyn
American drama television films
1980s English-language films
1980s American films